Challengers is the fourth studio album by Canadian indie rock band the New Pornographers, released on August 21, 2007. The track listing for the album was revealed June 1, 2007. A box set containing three blank CD-Rs, named "Executive Edition", was released August 7, 2007, two weeks before the album, with the  promise of future multimedia to be downloaded at the band's website for fans to compile and burn their own CDs. The first disc included B-sides, demos and alternate versions; the second, titled "Live from the Future", featured live performances of songs related to the album; the third disc includes videos, photos and album artwork. The bonus material was available for download with the pre-orders of Challengers.  "Failsafe" is an A.C. Newman song first recorded commercially by the Canadian indie pop band the Choir Practice, and appeared on their debut album several months before the release of Challengers.

Challengers debuted at number 34 on the U.S. Billboard 200, selling about 20,000 copies in its first week. "Myriad Harbour" was #79 on Rolling Stones list of the 100 Best Songs of 2007. As of 2010 it has sold 109,000 copies in US and 16,000 copies in Canada.

Track listing 
All songs were written by A. C. Newman, except where noted.

 "My Rights Versus Yours" – 4:14
 "All the Old Showstoppers" – 4:07
 "Challengers" – 3:29
 "Myriad Harbour" (Dan Bejar) – 3:55
 "All the Things That Go to Make Heaven and Earth" – 3:06
 "Failsafe" – 2:36
 "Unguided" – 6:30
 "Entering White Cecilia" (Bejar) – 3:26
 "Go Places" – 4:27
 "Mutiny, I Promise You" – 4:09
 "Adventures in Solitude" – 4:14
 "The Spirit of Giving" (Bejar) – 4:00
 "Silent Systems" (Japanese release)
 "Fortune" (Japanese release)

Vinyl edition 
The vinyl release adjusts the running order slightly, swapping the positions of two tracks so that "Unguided" closes side one and "Failsafe" starts side two rather than the other way around.

Side one 
 "My Rights Versus Yours" – 4:14
 "All the Old Showstoppers" – 4:07
 "Challengers" – 3:29
 "Myriad Harbour" (Bejar) – 3:55
 "All the Things That Go to Make Heaven and Earth" – 3:06
 "Unguided" – 6:30

Side two 
 "Failsafe" – 2:36
 "Entering White Cecilia" (Bejar) – 3:26
 "Go Places" – 4:27
 "Mutiny, I Promise You" – 4:09
 "Adventures in Solitude" – 4:14
 "The Spirit of Giving" (Bejar) – 4:00

Executive Edition 
Complete sets of Challengers Executive Edition are extremely rare. The Executive Edition was a limited edition 3-disc complement to the original release, which customers could put together to create a 4-disc set, but they had to build it themselves in 2007-2008 using a download code. The box-set came as three blank CD-Rs with branded packaging and labels. Using the code that came with the set, customers could download the additional music (as lossless FLAC files) and videos and create the three additional discs. Matador has since discontinued the download site. As a result, the only way to get the Executive Edition today is to find a used copy with the downloaded files burned to the CD-R. If you find a new, unopened copy, you will basically be purchasing three fancy, blank CD-Rs.

When complete, the three discs fit into the case along with the original release, making a four-CD set of the original release of Challengers plus a disc of b-sides and alternate mixes, a disc of live music (from Challengers and other New Pornographers albums), and a disc of videos and photos.

Disc two 
The second disc contains B-sides, demos and alternate mixes.

 "The Speed of Luxury" – 3:28 (Released July 6, 2007)
 "Silent Systems" – 4:06 (Released August 3, 2007)
 "Fortune" – 4:20 (Released August 28, 2007)
 "Failsafe" (demo) – 2:31 (Released September 11, 2007)
 "Showstoppers" (demo)- 4:07 (Released September 11, 2007)
 "Myriad Harbour" (demo) – 3:47 (Released September 11, 2007)
 "Go Places" (Lite Mix) – 4:28 (Released September 25, 2007)
 "Fugue State" – 3:55 (Released November 21, 2007)
 "Arms of Mary/Looking At A Baby"
 "Joseph, Who Understood"

Disc three 
The third disc, titled Live from the Future, was released on January 10, 2008.

 "My Rights versus Yours" – 4:06
 "Use It" – 3:23
 "Myriad Harbour" – 3:56
 "Challengers" – 3:47
 "All the Old Showstoppers" – 4:12
 "Mass Romantic" – 3:54
 "Failsafe" – 2:37
 "Electric Version" – 2:52
 "Unguided" – 6:22
 "Adventures in Solitude" – 4:33
 "Jackie" (mislabeled as "Jackie, Dressed in Cobras") – 2:42
 "Go Places" – 4:53

Disc four 
The fourth disc contains Challengers videos and photos; it was released in October and November 2007.

 "Challengers" music video (Released October 12, 2007)
 "Myriad Harbour" music video

Plus multiple folders of photos from various locations in the Challengers Tour.

Personnel 
 A. C. Newman – vocals, guitar, piano, Wurlitzer, Casio, mandolin, percussion, bass, bass melodion
 Blaine Thurier – Fender Rhodes, sampler
 Dan Bejar – vocals, shakers, guitar, piano
 John Collins – bass, baritone guitar, glockenspiel, mandolin, guitars, Casio, tambourine
 Kathryn Calder – vocals, piano, Wurlitzer
 Kurt Dahle – drums, vocals, percussion
 Neko Case – vocals
 Todd Fancey – guitars, banjo, mandolin

Guest musicians 
 Alan Hampton – double bass
 Benjamin D. Calb – cello
 Brendan Ryan – accordion, French horn, trumpet
 Eileen Gannon – harp
 Leslie Kubicka – flute, piccolo
 Marla Hansen – viola
 Olivier Manchon – violin
 Phil Palazzolo – guitar
 Tara Szczygielski – violin

Production
 Phil Palazzolo - Producer
 John Collins - Producer
 A. C. Newman - Producer
 Howard Redekopp - Mixer

References

External links 
 Carl Newman reveals New Pornographers LP details
 New Pornographers Tease With Shows, Album Details
 

2007 albums
The New Pornographers albums
Matador Records albums
Albums produced by John Collins (Canadian musician)
Albums produced by A. C. Newman